Sayyid Meerakh Shah Kashani (سید میرک شاہ کاشانی), (6 September 1895 - 13 December 1971) properly known as Faqir-i-Milat, was a Sufi poet and 19th - 20th century spiritual leader who is amongst one of the founder of Anjuman Tableeg ul Islam (ATI), first Sunni Muslim organisation in Jammu and Kashmir and Madinat Ul Uloum institute. He was related to the sufi orders of Qadiriyya, Naqshbandi, Kubrawiya and Chishti Order.

Early life and education 
Mirakh Shah Kashani was born in 6 September 1895 in Saraf Kadal Srinagar Jammu and Kashmir to Sayyid Ahmed Shah Naqash. His mother died when he was two years old. After three years he lost his father as well. He had no formal education beyond initiation in Quran, Hadith and some Persian literature and when it was insisted upon he refused and began to spend time with fakirs or saints and Qalandars.

Sayyid Mirakh's ancestor Sayyid Habibullah Kashani, had migrated from Kashan, a city of Isfahan in Iran and he was the descendant of Prophet Muhammad through the ancestor lineage of Mir Sayyid Ali Hamadani.

He started calligraphy of Quranic verses to raise money to feed himself and his disciples.

Death and burial
It was 24th Shawwal, (13 December 1971), three days before Indo-Pak war ended that he died at the age of 76. He was buried in Shalimar Bagh, Srinagar called "Khanqah-i-Kashaniyah" near his predecessors, Abdul Qadoos and Laal Shah Sahib. On his death date (Hijri), his Ur's is being observed every year.

Works 
• Jaam-e-Irfan (Goblet Of Knowledge), poetry collection published by Khanqah-i-Kashaniyah whose second addition was published in 2008.

See also 
 Abdul Qadir Gilani 
 Jalaluddin Surkh-Posh Bukhari
 Mir Sayyid Ali Hamadani
 Moinuddin Hadi Naqshband

References

History of Islam
Sufism
Islam in Kashmir
1895 births
1971 deaths
Srinagar
Sufi poets